Wong Hong Mok (better known as Huang Hongmo 黄宏墨) is a xinyao (新谣 Singapore Chinese folk-pop) singer-songwriter, music producer and professional photographer from Singapore. He, along with Liang Wern Fook and others are seen as pioneers of the genre.

His singing style has been described as bold and unrestrained but, unlike other xinyao singer-songwriters, writes about nature, and self. He has said that this comes from the time in his life when he spent a lot of time near the sea.

Crediting his father for his love of music, he is a self-taught musician; his family was too poor for him to be able to take music lessons. As well as playing the guitar, he taught himself how to play the harmonica and the piano.

As he grew up, he found most of the music that was around in the Chinese music scene, meaningless; however, inspired by the music of Lo Ta-Yu (罗大佑) from Taiwan, whose writings he found more meaningful, he started to write his own songs and, in 1982, wrote his first song, Discard (抛). His songs were first heard on the radio in 1984 on the Chinese radio programme New Voices, New Songs (歌韵新声), which was seen as a gateway for young musicians.

He won the “Best Lyrics Award” at the 1999 New Ballad Festival (新谣节). In June 2004, Wong Hong Mok was the first to represent Singapore in the 2nd Asia Music Concert (第二届中新歌会). In 1990, his first album "Wild Man's Dream" (野人的梦) was well received by music lovers. He remains the all-time favourite guest performer on MediaCorp Channel 8. His works include:
 "Endless Enchantment" (万种风情)
 "Childhood Homeland" (童言故乡)
 "The Wild Man's Dreams" (野人的梦)
 "The Soliloquy of a Stupid Bird" (笨鸟的表白)
 "Sunset Lake Colours" (夕阳湖色)
 "Mountain Affair" (山情) 
 "Final Reminiscence" (最后的惦记)
 "If You Haven't Been Here Before" (如果你不曾来过) 
 "Cherish" (惜缘) 
 "No Return" (不能回头)
 "Silence" (沉默)

References

 Concerts - Wong Hong Mok: A Wild Man's Dreams | Singapore Informer
 Xinyao uniquely Singapore | AsiaOne

Singaporean musicians